Karainagar Divisional Council ( Kārainakar Piratēca Capai; KDC) is the local authority for Karainagar DS Division in northern Sri Lanka. KDC is responsible for providing a variety of local public services including roads, sanitation, drains, housing, libraries, public parks and recreational facilities. It has 5 members elected using the open list proportional representation system. KDC is sometimes called Karativu Divisional Council.

History
Karainagar Divisional Council was created with effect from 15 April 2006 from parts of Kayts Divisional Council. However, according to the pro-LTTE TamilNet, the Sri Lankan government had suspended all local government in the north and east of the country in 1983 using emergency regulations. The civil war prevented elections from being held for KDC until 2011.

On 27 January 2006 local authority elections were called for the entire country. It was later announced that elections would be held on 30 March 2006 across the entire country. The Election Commissioner subsequently postponed the elections in the north and Batticaloa District until 30 September 2006. On 23 September 2006 elections in the north and Batticaloa District were postponed until 30 June 2007.

KDC continued to be administered by special commissioners until the 2011 elections.

Election results

2011 local government election
Results of the local government election held on 23 July 2011:

The following candidates were elected: Velautham Anaimugan (TNA), 1,540 preference votes (pv); Veeramuthu Kannnan (UPFA), 1,393 pv; Balachanthiran Ganeshapillai (UNP), 1,240 pv; Chandrasegaram Thurkeswaran (TNA), 709 pv; and Subramaniam Yogeswaran (TNA), 376 pv.

Velautham Anaimugan (TNA) and Chandrasegaram Thurkeswaran (TNA) were appointed Chairman and Deputy Chairman respectively.

References

Karainagar DS Division
Local authorities in Northern Province, Sri Lanka